Cuspidata ditoma is a species of moth of the family Tortricidae. It is found in Madagascar.

Subspecies
Cuspidata ditoma ditoma
Cuspidata ditoma peratra Diakonoff, 1973

References

Moths described in 1960
Archipini